Kinley Mack (foaled 1896 in Montana) was an American National Champion Thoroughbred racehorse whose racing accomplishments included breaking a track record at Sheepshead Bay Race Track and becoming the first horse to ever win both the Brooklyn and the Suburban Handicaps.

Pedigree

References

1896 racehorse births
Racehorses bred in Montana
Racehorses trained in the United States
Horse racing track record setters
American Champion racehorses
Thoroughbred family 26